Anthony Dow is a British television director best known for his work on Only Fools and Horses.  He has won two BAFTAs and been nominated four times.

Filmography
Only Fools and Horses (1988–2003, 2014)
Birds of a Feather (1989)
Nightingales (1990-93)
Hunderby (2012–2015)
Big School (2013)
Stella (2012–16)
Victoria Wood's Mid Life Christmas (2009)
After You've Gone (2007)

Awards
Dow has won two BAFTAs, both for Only Fools and Horses.  He has been nominated four times.

References

External links

British television directors
Year of birth missing (living people)
Living people
Place of birth missing (living people)